Andrea Aromatico (born on 22 September 1966) is an Italian historian, art historian, journalist, essayist, writer and expert in Hermetic iconography and esotericism.

Career 
Aromatico was born in Urbino, educated at the Faculty of Letters and Philosophy of University of Urbino. He is manager of the historical archives for the Region of Pesaro-Urbino, Italy. He has worked for various Italian public and private organisations and was responsible for a scientific exhibition dedicated to alchemy in Urbino in 1998. He has taught at the University of Perugia where he gave seminars and special courses. From 1999 to 2001, he was professor of art history at Ludes University of Lugano and was director of external relations at the same university since 2000. He has held conferences and seminars at numerous cultural centres and universities in Italy and abroad.

He collaborates with various magazines and is director of Secreta, a magazine of esotericism and mystery. As a television consultant, director and screenwriter, he has collaborated for years with Rai 2 and the programme schedules of the Seasons e Diana Web TV networks, of which he is currently the director. He has also authored a comic series entitled .

The book  (lit. 'Alchemy: The Gold of Knowledge') is part of an Italian collection "Universale Electa/Gallimard", published by Electa/Gallimard in 1996 in their  series. The French edition——published by Éditions Gallimard, came out in the same year, but Gallimard shortened the "Documents" section at the back of the book. The English edition, entitled Alchemy: The Great Secret, is based on the French instead of the original Italian, was released in the United States in 2000, distributed by Harry N. Abrams in the "Abrams Discoveries" series. It is a pint-sized coffee table book, replete with colour plates, all well reproduced, with useful information in the captions. There are three chapters: I, "The Concept of Alchemy"; II, "The Theory of Alchemy"; III, "The Practice of Alchemy". These are followed by a section of five "Documents" (Italian edition has ten), which are excerpts taken from well-known texts on alchemy: 1, The earliest sources; 2, The medieval mystics and scientists; 3, The triumph of Hermetism in the Renaissance; 4, Alchemy in the modern era; 5, Alchemy in literature. There is a list of further reading, where is also included a number of English sources. The book closes with a list of illustrations and an index. It is the only work by Andrea Aromatico which has been translated into English, and other translations including Japanese, Polish, South Korean, Spanish and simplified Chinese, all of which are based on the French version.

Aromatico explores in the book this compound of science and myth, examining ancient texts and illuminated manuscripts to shed light on an enigmatic science of spells, ceremonies, and secret beliefs.

Selected publications 
 With Marcella Peruzzi, Medicamenti, pozioni e incantesimi del Ricetario Magico Urbinate, Roche, 1994
 Alchimia: l'oro della conoscenza, collection «Universale Electa/Gallimard» (nº 86), serie Storia e civiltà. 176 pages. Electa/Gallimard, 1996
 Alchimie, le grand secret, collection « Découvertes Gallimard » (nº 302), série Culture et société. 144 pages. Éditions Gallimard, 1996 (translated from the Italian by Audrey van de Sandt)
 Alchemy: The Great Secret, "Abrams Discoveries" series. 144 pages. Harry N. Abrams, 2000 (translated from the French by Jack Hawkes)
 With Umberto Piersanti, Il poeta e il cacciatore, Editoriale Olimpia, 2008
 La flagellazione: Il romanzo, i codici, il mistero, Petruzzi Editore, 2012
 Urbino itinerari turistici: Percorsi e vie, Arti Grafiche Stibu, 2013

Notes

References

External links
  

1966 births
20th-century Italian historians
Italian essayists
Male essayists
University of Urbino alumni
Living people
People from Urbino
Western esotericism scholars
Italian male non-fiction writers
21st-century Italian historians